Saints of Big Harbour is a novel by Lynn Coady, published in 2002 by Doubleday Canada. It was Coady's first novel to be published in the United States.

Plot summary 
In Saints of Big Harbour, Coady portrays a small community of Cape Breton Island, found off the coast of Nova Scotia. The book focuses on the perspectives of the main character, Guy Boucher, a fatherless Acadian teenager, and of those who surround him: his alcoholic uncle Isadore, a quietly wise girl named Pam, his draft-dodger English teacher and a group of boys stuck in emotional adolescence. As the story unfolds it becomes clear that Guy lives in a community firmly characterized by clichés of gender, beauty, strength, family and love.

2002 Canadian novels
Novels set in Nova Scotia
Cape Breton Island
Doubleday Canada books